Lisa Lucas (born 1961) is an American former child actress best known for her role as "Addie Mills" in the Emmy-winning Christmas television special, The House Without a Christmas Tree.

Career 
Lucas also played Shirley MacLaine's daughter in the 1977 film The Turning Point, and Jill Clayburgh's daughter in 1978 film An Unmarried Woman. In its review of An Unmarried Woman, The Washington Post said the part of the daughter was "smartly embodied by sharp-featured young actress Lisa Lucas" and Lucas was nominated for the New York Film Critics Circle Award for Best Supporting Actress. Lucas also had roles in the films Hadley's Rebellion (1983) and Heart and Souls (1993), the 1976 PBS series The Adams Chronicles and the 1980 television film A Perfect Match. In 2002, Lucas appeared in a Denver stage production of Cat on a Hot Tin Roof.

Filmography

Film

Television

References

External links 
 

Living people
American child actresses
American television actresses
American film actresses
American stage actresses
20th-century American actresses
21st-century American actresses
1961 births